Across the Sierras is a 1941 American Western film directed by D. Ross Lederman and starring Bill Elliott.

Plot
After six years in prison, Mitch Carew returns to Arroyo to seek his revenge on the two men who sent him to prison, shopkeeper Dan Woodworth and Wild Bill Hickok. Carew goads Woodworth into drawing a pistol allowing him to legally kill the elderly Woodworth in self-defence.

Meanwhile, Hickok rescues his ne'er do well friend Larry Armstrong from a lynch mob with the idea that both of them settle down on a ranch. Though Bill finds the love of an Eastern girl, the lure of adventure and the Code of the West lead the pair into trouble, gunplay and vengeance.

Cast
 Bill Elliott as Wild Bill Hickok
 Richard Fiske as Larry Armstrong
 Luana Walters as Anne Woodworth
 Dub Taylor as Cannonball
 Dick Curtis as Mitch Carew
 LeRoy Mason as Stringer
 Ruth Robinson as Lu Woodworth
 John Dilson as Dan Woodworth
 Milton Kibbee as Sheriff (as Milt Kibbee)
 Ralph Peters as Hobie

References

External links
 

1941 films
1941 Western (genre) films
American Western (genre) films
American black-and-white films
1940s English-language films
Films directed by D. Ross Lederman
Columbia Pictures films
1940s American films